Park Geun-hyung (born June 7, 1940) is a South Korean actor. His career in film, television and theater has spanned over five decades.

Career 
He was born in Suseong-ri, Jeongju-eup, Jeongeup-gun, Jeollabuk-do during the Japanese colonial period in 1940 (currently, Suseong-dong, Jeongeup-si). After graduating from middle school, he studied at Whimoon High School in Seoul. He was active in the theater department at Whimoon High School. Then He majored in theater and film at Seorabeol Arts College (predecessor of Chung-Ang University College of Arts), and became a member of the National Theater Company after graduation. Park debuted in 1963 KBS 3rd public recruitment talent.

Variety Show 
In 2013, cable channel tvN launched the travel-reality show Grandpas Over Flowers (the title parodies the manga Boys Over Flowers). It marked producer Na Young-seok's first variety show since leaving KBS, where he was best known for creating the first season of hit variety show 2 Days & 1 Night. Defying a youth-centered entertainment industry, the hit show stars four veteran actors in their 70s, Lee Soon-jae, Shin Goo and Baek Il-seob, with their porter actor Lee Seo-jin as they go on a backpacking tour of France, Taiwan and Spain.

The first season aired from July 5 to August 16, 2013 with seven episodes. It was filmed in Paris, Strasbourg, Bern, and Lucerne. It was immediately followed by the airing of the second season from August 23 to September 20, 2013. The five episodes were filmed in Taiwan, with an additional two-episode special featuring unaired footage on September 27 and October 4, 2013. The third season aired from March 7 to May 2, 2014 with eight episodes. It was filmed in Spain, specifically the cities of Barcelona, Granada, Seville, Ronda, and Madrid. Shin Goo also went on a solo trip to Lisbon. The fourth season aired from March 27 to May 8, 2015 with seven episodes. It was filmed in Dubai and Greece, with Choi Ji-woo joining as a second travel guide and assistant.

After a few years' break, a fifth season titled Grandpa Over Flowers Returns aired from June 29 to August 24, 2018 with nine episodes. Actor Kim Yong-gun joined the cast for the trip filmed in Germany, Czech Republic and Austria.

Filmography

Film

7 People in the Cellar (1969) 
Lovers of Seoul (1973)
Spies in the National Assembly (1974)
The Wild Flowers in the Battlefield (1974)
Pupils of Evil (1974)
Lee Jung-seob, a Painter (1974)
Black Butterfly (1974)
The Tigress (1974)
The Instinct (1974)
Flower and Snake (1975)
Unfortunate Woman (1975)
Visitor in Dawn (1975)
Wasteland (1975)
Wood and Swamp (1975)
Lovers (1975)
A Special Investigator, One-Armed Kim Jong-won (1975)
Why Did I Do That? (1975)
Black Night (1975)
An Extinguished Window (1976)
Seong Chun-hyang (1976)
A Young Man Aware of Kwang Hwa Moon Well (1976)
Wife (1976)
The Door (1977)
Under the Sky With No Mother (Sequel) (1977)
The Land of Snow (1977)
The World without Mom (1977)
A Traveler with Love (1977)
Scholar Yul-gok and His Mother Shin Sa-im-dang (1978)
The Door of Youth (1978)
Chorus of Doves (1978)
Confession of Life or Death (1978)
Wanderer (1978)
There Must be Mother Somewhere (1978)
Festival of the Chicks (1978)
The Swamp of Exile (1978)
No More Sorrow (1978)
The Loneliness of the Journey (1978)
The Trappings of Youth (1979)
The Rain at Night (1979)
Jade Color (1979)
Who Knows the Pain (1979)
Eternal Inheritance (1979)
Miss Oh's Apartment (Sequel) (1979)
The Woman Who Stole the Sun (1979)
The Last Secret Affair (1980)
The Man Who Dies Every Day (1980)
Lonely Star of Osaka (1980)
The Warm-hearted Girl Gok-ji (1980)
Home of the Stars 3 (1981)
A Battle Journal (1981)
The Invited Ones (1981)
Tears of the Idol (1981)
Iron Men (1982)
The Tender Passion of the Thirteenth Month (1982)
Sweethearts (1983)
Daughter of Fire (1983)
The Stolen Apple Tastes Good (1984)
The Last Day of That Summer (1984)
I Want To Go (1984)
An Ark Shell Lands on Earth (1985)
Getting on the Elevator (1985)
A Long Journey, A Long Tunnel (1986)
Ticket (1986)
Gorgeous Transformation (1987)
Yohwa Eoludong (1987)
The Lady in the Wall (1988)
All For You (1989)
Who Broke the Red Rose Stem (1990)
Enchantment (1990)
Fire and Blood (1991)
Who Saw the Dragon's Toenail? (1991)
I Have Nothing (1991)
The Son and the Lover (1992)
The Rose of Sharon Blooms Again (1995)
Boss (1996)
Kill the Love (1996)
Channel 69 (1996)
Father (1997)
Free to Fly (1997)
Promenade (2000)
The Rhapsody (2001)
Boss X File (2002)
Marrying the Mafia (2002)
Another Public Enemy (2005)
Parallel Life (2010)
Grand Prix (2010)
Return of the Mafia (2012)
Boomerang Family (2013)
Salut d'Amour (2015)
 Because I Love You (2017)
 Detective K: Secret of the Living Dead (2018)
 Innocent Witness (2019)
 In the Name of the Son (2021)
 Camellia (2021)
 Remember (2022)

Television series

Lovers of the Sun (MBC, 1969)
Beloved Reed (MBC, 1969)
Frog Husband (MBC, 1969)
The Imjin War (KBS, 1972)
Song of the Reeds (MBC, 1972)
Kowloon Peninsula (KBS, 1973)
Royal Emissary (KBS, 1973)
Telephone (KBS, 1974)
Some Couples (KBS, 1974)
Servant Girl (KBS, 1974)
Wings (KBS, 1974)
Rivers and Mountains of the Eight Provinces in Bloom (KBS, 1974)
On Ruya (KBS, 1974)
Heartless (KBS, 1975)
I Regret It (MBC, 1977)
Trap of Youth (MBC, 1978)
Happiness for Sale (MBC, 1978)
Even if the Wind Blows (MBC, 1978)
Who Are You (MBC, 1979)
Chief Inspector  (MBC, 1979)
Terminal (MBC, 1980)
Lawyer Hong (MBC, 1980)
The First Republic (MBC, 1981)
Nari House (MBC, 1981)
Cloth and Paper (KBS2, 1981)
Aging Human (KBS1, 1981)
Conditions of Love (KBS2, 1982)
Galaxy of Dreams (KBS1, 1983)
Diary of Youth (KBS2, 1983)
Geum-nam's House (KBS1, 1983)
Cliff (KBS1, 1984)
Fireworks (KBS2, 1984)
Silver Rapids (KBS1, 1985)
Police Task Force (KBS2, 1985)
Farewell to Love (KBS2, 1986)
Lee Cha-don (KBS1, 1987)
MBC Bestseller Theater "Piano Murder" (MBC, 1987)
Guests Who Arrived on the Last Train (MBC, 1987)
Temptation (MBC, 1987)
Love and Ambition (MBC, 1987)
The Golden Tower (KBS2, 1988)
Human Market (MBC, 1988)
The Sandcastle (MBC, 1988)
Young-joo's Proof (KBS1, 1989)
The Fifth Row (MBC, 1989)
Half of a Failure - Divorced Couples  (KBS2, 1989)
Night Train (KBS1, 1990)
Ambitious Times (KBS2, 1990)
Wife's Garden (KBS2, 1990)
Rosy Life (MBC, 1991)
My Heart Is a Lake (MBC, 1991)
Eyes of Dawn (MBC, 1991)
Calendula (SBS, 1992)
Namok (MBC, 1992)
Rainbow in Mapo (MBC, 1992)
Gwanchon Essay (SBS, 1992)
The Third Republic (MBC, 1993)
Good Morning, Yeong-dong (KBS2, 1993)
Woman's Mirror (SBS, 1993)
The Distant Ssongba River (SBS, 1993)
My Mother's Sea (MBC, 1993)
Friday's Woman "Choi Myung-gil's Woman on the Edge of the Cliff" (KBS2, 1993)
Police (KBS2, 1994)
Adam's City (MBC, 1994)
Last Lovers (MBC, 1994)
A Sunny Place of the Young (KBS2, 1995)
The Fourth Republic (MBC, 1995)
Journey (KBS2, 1995)
War and Love (MBC, 1995)
Your Voice (SBS, 1995)
You Said You Loved Me (KBS2, 1995)
A Bold Man (KBS2, 1995)
Sandglass (SBS, 1995)
Ahn Joong-geun (SBS, 1996)
Until We Can Love (KBS1, 1996)
Crime Squad (MBC, 1996)
The Brothers' River (SBS, 1996)
Yesterday (MBC, 1997)
Beyond the Horizon (SBS, 1997)
Until the Azalea Blooms (KBS2, 1998)
Barefoot Days (KBS2, 1998)
Seven Brides (SBS, 1998)
The King's Path (MBC, 1998)
Advocate (MBC, 1998)
Love and Success (MBC, 1998)
Should My Tears Show (MBC, 1999)
Sunday Best "Just a Pickpocket's Pattern" (KBS2, 1999)
When Time Flows (MBC, 1999)
Sunday Best "The Wind Blows in Yeouido" (KBS2, 1999)
The Little Prince (KBS2, 1999)
Days of Delight (MBC, 1999)
Into the Sunlight (MBC, 1999)
Oh-cheon's Secret Number (KBS, 2000)
Tough Guy's Love (KBS2, 2000)
Fireworks (SBS, 2000)
Foolish Princes (MBC, 2000)
SWAT Police (SBS, 2000)
Secret (MBC, 2000)
Daddy Fish (MBC, 2000)
Delicious Proposal (MBC, 2001)
Stock Flower (KBS2, 2001)
Her House (MBC, 2001)
Morning Without Parting (SBS, 2001)
Pure Heart (KBS2, 2001)
Wonderful Days (SBS, 2001)
My Name is Princess (MBC, 2002)
Miss Mermaid (MBC, 2002)
Affection (SBS, 2002)
Ice Flower (SBS, 2002)
Fairy and Swindler (SBS, 2003)
South of the Sun (SBS, 2003)
Phoenix (MBC, 2004)
Beautiful Temptation (KBS2, 2004)
Traveling Women (SBS, 2005)
Hong Kong Express (SBS, 2005)
Love Hymn (MBC, 2005)
Love and Sympathy (SBS, 2005)
Becoming a Popular Song  (KBS2, 2005) 
Marrying a Millionaire (SBS, 2005)
Jumong (MBC, 2006)
Exhibition of Fireworks (MBC, 2006)
My Beloved Sister (MBC, 2006)
My Lovely Miss Dal-ja (SBS, 2006)
Special Crime Investigation: Murder in the Blue House (KBS2, 2006)
By My Side (MBC, 2007)
The Person I Love (SBS, 2007)
Surgeon Bong Dal-hee (SBS, 2007)
Cruel Love (KBS2, 2007)
Woman of Matchless Beauty, Park Jung-geum (MBC, 2008)
HDTV Literature "Spring, Spring Spring" (KBS2, 2008)
You Are Very Good (KBS2, 2008)
East of Eden (MBC, 2008)
Glass Castle (SBS, 2008)
The Road Home (KBS1, 2009)
The Return of Iljimae (MBC, 2009)
Assorted Gems (MBC, 2009)
Definitely Neighbors (SBS, 2010)
Daemul (SBS, 2010)
It's Okay, Daddy's Girl (SBS, 2010)
You're So Pretty (MBC, 2011)
The Musical (MBN, 2011)
Color of Woman (Channel A, 2011)
Tasty Life (SBS, 2012)
The Chaser (SBS, 2012)
Ms Panda and Mr Hedgehog (Channel A, 2012)
The Third Hospital (tvN, 2012)
Ugly Cake (MBC, 2012)
The King of Dramas (SBS, 2012)
How Long I've Kissed (JTBC, 2012)
You're Great, Really! (MBC, 2013)
Empire of Gold (SBS, 2013)
The Suspicious Housekeeper (SBS, 2013)
A Little Love Never Hurts (MBC, 2013)
Mother's Garden (MBC, 2014)
Tears of Heaven (MBN, 2014)
4 Legendary Witches (MBC, 2014)
Angry Mom (MBC, 2015)
The Love is Coming (SBS, 2016)
Criminal Minds (South Korean TV series) (tvN, 2017)
Evergreen (OCN, 2018) 
I Am the Mother Too (SBS, 2018)
Four Men (2018)
A Pledge to God (2018)
Doctor Detective (2019)
The Good Detective (JTBC, 2020–2022) - Season 1–2 
 Undercover (JTBC, 2021)
 Taxi Driver (SBS, 2021) (Cameo) 
 Sponsor (IHQ, 2022)
 Island (tvN, 2022)

Variety show
내고장만세 (KBS, 1977)
여성넘버원 (DBS, 1978)
화첩기행 (TJB, 2007)
유정천리 (Jeonju MBC Radio, 2010)
The Chaser with Park Geun-hyung (TV Chosun, 2013)
Grandpas Over Flowers (tvN, 2013-2018)
 Granpar 그랜파 (MBN ,2021)

Music video
Melo Breeze - "Mo Memory" (2006)

Theater
King Lear (1983)
Two Women, Two Men (1992)
The Abduction from the Seraglio (1999)
Snow in March (2012)

Awards
1968 5th Dong-A Theatre Awards: Best Actor (실과 바늘의 악장)
1974 13th Grand Bell Awards: Best Actor (Lee Jung-seob, a Painter)
1979 15th Baeksang Arts Awards: Best Actor (The Swamp of Exile)
1979 The Korea Times: Actor of the Year
1989 25th Baeksang Arts Awards: Most Popular TV Actor (Sandcastle)
1991 29th Grand Bell Awards: Best Supporting Actor (Who Saw the Dragon's Toenail?)
1996 SBS Drama Awards: Grand Prize/Daesang (The Brothers' River)
1997 24th Korea Broadcasting Awards: Best Male Talent
1999 MBC Drama Awards: Special Award
2000 KBS Drama Awards: Top Excellence Award, Actor (Tough Guy's Love)
2002 MBC Drama Awards: Special Award (Miss Mermaid)
2005 KBS Drama Awards: Best Actor in a One-Act Drama/Special (Becoming a Popular Song)
2007 5th Korean Culture and Environment Awards: Best Talent
2008 MBC Drama Awards: Golden Acting Award, Actor in a Serial Drama (Woman of Matchless Beauty, Park Jung-geum, East of Eden)
2010 SBS Drama Awards: Achievement Award (Daemul)
2012 SBS Drama Awards: PD Award (The Chaser)

References

External links
 
 
 

People from North Jeolla Province
South Korean male film actors
South Korean male television actors
South Korean male stage actors
Chung-Ang University alumni
Living people
1940 births